Hypolophota oodes is a species of snout moth in the genus Hypolophota. It was described by Turner in 1904, and is known from Australia (including Queensland).

References

Moths described in 1904
Tirathabini